Cocorăștii Mislii is a commune in Prahova County, Muntenia, Romania. It is composed of three villages: Cocorăștii Mislii, Goruna and Țipărești.

References

Communes in Prahova County
Localities in Muntenia